2-Ethylidene-1,5-dimethyl-3,3-diphenylpyrrolidine (EDDP) is a major metabolite of methadone.

References

Human drug metabolites
Pyrrolidines